The Serbs of Bosnia and Herzegovina are one of the three constitutive nations (state-forming nations) of the country, predominantly residing in the political-territorial entity of Republika Srpska. They are frequently referred to as Bosnian Serbs in English, regardless of whether they are from Bosnia or Herzegovina.

Serbs have a long and continuous history of inhabiting the present-day territory of Bosnia and Herzegovina, and a long history of statehood in this territory. Slavs settled the Balkans in the 7th century and the Serbs were one of the main tribes who settled the peninsula including parts of modern-day Herzegovina. Parts of Bosnia were ruled by the Serbian prince Časlav in the 10th century before his death in 960. The territories of Duklja, including Zeta and Zachlumia were later consolidated into a Serbian Kingdom before its fall in 1101. In the second half of the 12th century, Bosnia and Herzegovina was ruled by the Nemanjić dynasty. Stephen Tomašević ruled briefly as Despot of Serbia in 1459 and as King of Bosnia between 1461 and 1463. 

From the 15th to the 19th century, Ottoman rule brought discrimination against the Orthodox (Serb) population living in Bosnia and Herzegovina under the millet system, but also a Serb national consciousness. The 20th century was marked by persecution from the government of Austria-Hungary, WWII genocide, and eventual breakup of Yugoslavia leading to the Bosnian War. In the 1990s, many Serbs moved to Serbia proper and Montenegro.

Having lived in much of Bosnia-Herzegovina prior to the Bosnian War, the majority of the Serbs now live in Republika Srpska. According to the report by the Bosnia and Herzegovina statistics office, on the census of 2013 there were 1,086,733 Serbs living in Bosnia and Herzegovina. In the Federation of Bosnia and Herzegovina, Serbs form the majority in Drvar, Glamoč, Bosansko Grahovo and Bosanski Petrovac. At the federal level, Serbs are represented by members in the Parliamentary Assembly of Bosnia and Herzegovina while on the state level, Republika Srpska has its own people's assembly. The Serbs of Bosnia and Herzegovina have made significant contributions to the culture of Bosnia and Herzegovina.

History

Kingdom of Serbia

Slavs settled the Balkans in the 7th century. In the second quarter of the 7th century, the Serbs were one of the main Slavic tribes who settled the peninsula and came to dominate the previous Slav settlers. In the same manner as their Croat counterparts, the Serb elite respectively labeled those mass Slavic populations they ruled over as Serbs, thus absorbing large numbers of Slavs whose ancestry was in actuality traced back to the previous century. Serb settlement was initially in modern-day southwestern Serbia. The region of "Rascia" (Raška) was the center of Serb settlement and Serbian tribes are also thought to have occupied parts near the Adriatic coast, especially modern-day Herzegovina and Montenegro. Prince Vlastimir (r. 830–850) united the Serbian tribes in the vicinity, and after a victory over the advancing Bulgars he went on to expand to the west, taking Bosnia, and Zahumlje (Herzegovina)). Afterwards, Prince Petar (r. 892–917), defeated Duke Tišemir of Bosnia, annexing the valley of Bosna.

Around this time is when Bosnia is first attested to as a separate territory, in De Administrando Imperio (ca. 960), a political and geographical document written by Eastern Roman Emperor Constantine VII. In a section dedicated to the territories of the Serbian prince his lands are described as including "Bosona, Katera and Desnik", demonstrating Bosnia's dependency on Serbs, although the areas comprised were smaller than modern-day Bosnia. Prince Časlav had enlarged Serbia, incorporating Travunija and parts of Bosnia, effectively ruling Bosnia in the 10th century until his death in 960. Following his death, much of Bosnia would be subjected to Croatian rule, before the arrival of Samuel of Bulgaria who subjugated the territory but eventually found himself deposed by the Byzantine empire.

Over the course of the 11th century, Bosnia shifted between partial Croatian and partial Serbian governance. To the south of Bosnia proper lay the territories of Duklja, which included Zeta and Zachlumia who were consolidated into a Serbian Kingdom ruled by local Serb princes. By the 1070s this would also include the region of Raška. Under Constantin Bodin, Serbian territory expanded to take most of Bosnia but the Kingdom broke up following his death in 1101. For much of the 12th century Bosnia was in a tug of war between Hungary and the Byzantine empire; Hungary annexed it 1137 before losing it to the Byzantine empire in 1167, and retaking it in 1180. After 1180, Ban Kulin, ruler of Bosnia began to assert his independence and Hungarian control became nominal. Prior to this emerging independence, Bosnia thus found itself at times under Serbian rule, particularly during the middle of the 10th century and the end of the 11th. For most of the early medieval period Herzegovina was in practice, Serbian territory. Bosnia proper however was tied politically and religiously more towards Croatia. The historians John Fine Jr. and Robert J. Donia, in considering that before 1180 Bosnia briefly found itself in Serb or Croat units, concluded that neither neighbor had held the Bosnians long enough to acquire their loyalty or to impose any serious claim to Bosnia.

In the second half of the 12th century, Serbian unity and power grows exponentially with the formation of the Nemanjić dynasty led by Stefan Nemanja, Grand Prince (župan) of Raška. Modern-day Montenegro, Bosnia, Herzegovina, and central Serbia would come under his control. By the Middle Ages, Eastern Orthodox Christianity had become entrenched in Herzegovina, and during the Nemanjić dynasty the Serbian Orthodox Church's influence grew in the region. However, Orthodoxy lacked consequential progression into Bosnia until Ottoman conquest.

The Kotromanić (pl. Kotromanići/Котроманићи) noble and later royal dynasties would rule Bosnia from the second half of the 13th century until Ottoman conquest in 1463. It began with Stephen II, Ban of Bosnia in 1322, who managed to expand the realm of the Bosnian state with the acquisition of territories that included Herzegovina, enabling the formation of a single Bosnia and Herzegovina political entity for the first time. The Kotromanić intermarried with several southeastern and central European royal houses which aided in their dynastic development. Stephen II's nephew Tvrtko I, a descendant of the Serbian Nemanjić dynasty, succeeded him and established the Kingdom of Bosnia in 1377, crowning himself as "The King of Serbia/Serbs and Bosnia". The last sovereign, Stephen Tomašević, ruled briefly as Despot of Serbia in 1459 and as King of Bosnia between 1461 and 1463, before losing both countries and his life to the Ottoman Turks. Herzegovina fell in 1466.

According to the historian Neven Isailovović, there was a general awareness in medieval Bosnia, at least amongst the nobles, that they shared a join state with Serbia and that they belong to the same ethnic group. That awareness diminished over time, due to differences in political and social development, but it was kept in Herzegovina and parts of Bosnia which were a part of Serbian state.

Ottoman rule

The conquest of Bosnia by the Ottomans brought significant administrative, economic, social and cultural changes to the country. The Ottomans however, allowed for the preservation of Bosnian identity and territorial integrity by merely making Bosnia an integral province of its Empire. Under the millet system, Christians were afforded a level of autonomy by the provision of local leaders who served the Ottoman state for religious, social, administrative and legal purposes. The Ottomans allowed Christian communities to band together around these religious leaders and preserve their customs. Consequently, this system also made a clear distinction between Muslims and non-Muslims, paving the way for Islamic supremacy and discrimination towards Christians. For instance, non-Muslims had to pay additional taxes and could not own any land or property or hold positions in the Ottoman state apparatus. Thus, conversion to Islam was advantageous to Bosnians and the 15th and 16th centuries marked the beginning of the Islamization period. A major effect of this system was also the development of distinct national identities among the three Bosnian groups during the 19th century, resulting in the spread of Orthodoxy and its assimilation into a Serbian national consciousness for Orthodox people throughout the empire. Given the threat of the Austro-Hungarian empire, the Catholics of Bosnia faced strenuous religious oppression, although this same level of discrimination would also be applied to Orthodox believers with the rise of an independent Serbian state in the 19th century. The Ottomans introduced a sizeable Orthodox Christian population into Bosnia proper, including Vlachs from the eastern Balkans. The conversion of the adherents of the Bosnian Church also aided the spread of Eastern Orthodoxy. Later, areas abandoned by Catholics during the Ottoman–Habsburg wars were settled with Muslims and Orthodox Christians.

Construction of Orthodox monasteries and churches throughout Bosnia started in the northwest in 1515. An Orthodox priest was present in Sarajevo already in 1489, and the city's first Orthodox church was constructed between 1520 and 1539. By 1532, Bosnian Orthodox Christians had their own metropolitan bishop, who took up official residence in Sarajevo in 1699. By the end of the 18th century, the Metropolitan of Bosnia had authority over the Orthodox bishops of Mostar, Zvornik, Novi Pazar and Sarajevo. A turning point in relations between the Orthodox Church and the Ottomans occurred when Orthodox clergy renounced loyalty to the sultans and started encouraging and aiding peasant rebellions, and seeking Christian allies in neighboring lands, which in turn resulted in the persecution of their clergy. Major Serb uprisings to Turkish rule occurred during the Long Turkish War (1593-1606) and Great Turkish War (1683-1699). During the 1593-1606 war, Serbs in the Banat along the border with Transylvania and Wallachia, and chieftains of the Herzegovina clans rebelled, both assisting enemies of the Ottomans and working toward restoring the Serbian state. Clan chiefs in Herzegovina cooperated with Italian counts and the Spanish viceroy, who was established in Naples.

As the rise of Western European development overshadowed the feudal Ottoman system, the empire began a sharp decline that was evident in the 19th century. Bosnia was at this point a regressive state with large landowners, poor peasantry, and a lack of industry and modern transport. A number of anti-Ottoman rebellions occurred, as the dissatisfaction of land-owning Bosnian Muslims aligned itself with nationalistic movements of the non-Muslim population. The various rebellions were largely directed at the Ottoman state and not a product of infighting between the various groups. The Serbs of Bosnia allied themselves with the cause of Serbian statehood; Muslim rebellions sought to stop administrative reforms and peasant rebellions were due to agrarian strife. After the reorganization of the Ottoman army and abolition of the Janissaries, Bosnian nobility revolted in 1831, led by Husein Gradaščević, who wanted to preserve existing privileges and stop any further social reforms. The pivotal rebellion began in 1875 with an uprising in Herzegovina on the part of the Christian population, led by Bosnian Serbs. Iniially a revolt against overtaxation by Bosnian Muslim landowners, it spread to a wider rebellion against the Ottoman rulers, with Bosnian Serbs vying for unity with Serbia. The Ottoman authorities were unable to contain the rebellion and it soon spread to other regions of the empire, with the Principality of Serbia joining and the Russian Empire doing the same, resulting in the Russo-Turkish War. The Turks lost the war in 1878. After the Congress of Berlin was held in same year, mandate of Bosnia and Herzegovina was transferred to the Austro-Hungarian Empire with nominal Ottoman sovereignty.

According to the historian Dušan T. Bataković, around one quarter of rebel leaders (voivodes) of the Serbian Revolution were born in modern-day Bosnia and Herzegovina or had their roots in the region of Bosnia or Herzegovina. Mateja Nenadović met with local Serb leaders from Sarajevo in 1803 in order to negotiate their part in the rebellion, with the ultimate goal being that the two armies meet in Sarajevo.

Austro-Hungarian occupation

Austro-Hungarian rule initially resulted in a fragmentation between the citizenry of Bosnia and Herzegovina, as technically they were subjects of the Ottomans while the land belonged to Austria-Hungary. The Austro-Hungarian administration advocated the ideal of a pluralist and multi-confessional Bosnian nation. Joint Imperial Minister of Finance and Vienna-based administrator of Bosnia Béni Kállay thus endorsed Bosnian nationalism in the form of Bošnjaštvo ("Bosniakhood") with the aim to inspire in Bosnia's people "a feeling that they belong to a great and powerful nation".

The Austro-Hungarians viewed Bosnians as "speaking the Bosnian language and divided into three religions with equal rights." On the one hand, these policies attempted to insulate Bosnia and Herzegovina from its irredentist neighbors (Eastern Orthodox Serbia, Catholic Croatia, and the Muslim Ottoman Empire) and to marginalize the already circulating ideas of Serbian and Croatian nationhood among Bosnia's Orthodox and Catholic communities, respectively. On the other hand, the Habsburg administrators precisely used the existing ideas of nationhood (especially Bosnian folklore and symbolism) in order to promote their own version of Bošnjak patriotism that aligned with loyalty to the Habsburg state. Habsburg policies are thus best described not as anti-national, but as cultivating their own style of pro-imperial nationalisms. These policies also heightened divisions along national and religious lines. Bosnian Serbs felt oppressed by the Austro-Hungarians who favored Roman Catholicism, and in turn the Croat population, who were the only members of the three constituent groups with any loyalty to the empire. After the death of Kallay, the policy was abandoned.

By 1905, nationalism was an integral factor of Bosnian politics, with national political parties corresponding to the three groups dominating elections. Austro-Hungarian authorities banned textbooks printed in Serbia and a number of other Serbian-language books they deemed to carry nationalistic content. A number of Bosnian Serb cultural and national organizations were formed in the early 20th century, one of which was the Prosvjeta. The Austro-Hungarian empire would wind up annexing the territory in 1908.

The first parliamentary elections in Bosnia and Herzegovina were held in 1910. The population was classified according to their ethno-religious status and each group was given its share of seats in the parliament according to their population. As the majority, the Serb representation was won by the Serbian National Organization, who received 31 seats.

On June 28, 1914, Bosnian Serb Gavrilo Princip made international headlines after assassinating Arch Duke Francis Ferdinand in Sarajevo. This sparked World War I leading to Austria-Hungary's defeat and the incorporation of Bosnia and Herzegovina into the Kingdom of Yugoslavia.

World War I
During WWI, Serbs in Bosnia were often blamed for the outbreak of the war, the assassination of Archduke Franz Ferdinand, and were subjected to persecution by the Austro-Hungarian authorities, including internment and looting of their businesses, by people who were instigated to ethnic violence. Early in the war, the Austro-Hungarian authorities unleashed a persecution of Bosnian Serbs, which included the internment of thousands in camps, court-martialing and death sentencing of intellectuals, massacres by the Schutzkorps, looting of property and forced expulsions.

Bosnian and Herzegovinian Serbs served in Montenegrin and Serbian army en masse, as they felt loyalty to the overall pan-Serbian cause. Bosnian Serbs also served in Austrian Army, and were loyal to Austria-Hungary when it came to Italian Front, but they often deserted and switched sides when they were sent to the Russian front, or to Serbian Front. Many Serbs supported the advance of fellow Montenegrin Serb Army, when it entered into Herzegovina, and advanced close to Sarajevo in 1914, as the King of Montenegro, King Nicholas I Petrovich-Njegos was very popular among Bosnian and Herzegovinian Serbs because of his pan-Serbian and Serbian nationalist views and help during Herzegovinian uprisings in the 19th century.

Kingdom of Serbs, Croats and Slovenes

After World War I, Bosnia and Herzegovina became part of the internationally unrecognized State of Slovenes, Croats and Serbs which existed between October and December 1918. In December 1918, this state united with the Kingdom of Serbia as Kingdom of Serbs, Croats and Slovenes, which was renamed the Kingdom of Yugoslavia in 1929. The Serbian leadership of the state decided to acknowledge demands of Muslim representative Mehmed Spaho, and respect the pre-war territorial integrity of Bosnia & Herzegovina, therefore not changing internal district borders of Bosnia.

Bosnian Serbs largely approved of a unification with Serbia as it appeared to be the realization of the common dream of being unified with all Serbs into one state. However, part of the Bosnian Serb population were unsatisfied given the fact that there was not a formal establishment between Bosnia and Herzegovina and Serbia. Bosnian Muslims saw the new arrangement as a form of colonial rule and instead argued for a decentralized unitary state with autonomy rights for constituents. Bosnian Croats meanwhile supported the federalization of Yugoslavia into six units, one of which was to be Bosnia and Herzegovina. The 1921 constitution affirmed the continued territorial existence of Bosnia as well as safeguarding protections for Muslims. This lasted until 1929 when King Alexander declared a dictatorship on 6 January. The Kingdom was renamed into Yugoslavia, divided into new territorial entities called Banovinas, largely based on natural borders. Bosnia and Herzegovina was divided into four banovinas, with Serbs constituting a majority in three of them. King Alexander was killed in 1934, which led to the end of dictatorship.

In 1939, faced with killings, corruption scandals, violence and the failure of centralized policy, the Serbian leadership agreed a compromise with Croats. Banovinas would later, in 1939, evolve into the final proposal for the partition of the joint state into three parts or three Banovinas, one Slovene Banovina, one Croatian and one Serbian, with each encompassing most of the ethnic space of each ethnic group. Most of the territory of contemporary Bosnia and Herzegovina was to be part of the Banovina Serbia, since most of the territory of Bosnia and Herzegovina was majority Serb-inhabited, and the Serbs constituted overall relative majority. On 26 August 1939, the president of the Croatian Peasant Party, Vladko Maček and Dragiša Cvetković made an agreement (Cvetković-Maček agreement) according to which a Banovina of Croatia was created which included Sava and the Littoral Banovina, along with a number of districts in southern Dalmatia, the Srem, and north-western Bosnia. Around 20% of the Croatian banovina was inhabited by Serbs, numbering some 800,000. These concessions were unsatisfactory to some Croats, with Serbs also being dissatisfied and seeking a banovina of their own. Bosnian Muslims meanwhile were not consulted on the partition plan and given no alternatives.

Competing ideologies among Serbs and Croats and their influences on Bosnia and Herzegovina, and to a broader extent, a lack of agreement on inter-ethnic relations in the new Yugoslav state and its governance resulted in perpetual instability. Yugoslavia however would only collapse after the Nazi Germany invasion of the country in April 1941, which dismembered the country into three different zones of occupation.

World War II

Following the invasion of Yugoslavia, the territory of Bosnia and Herzegovina was incorporated into the Independent State of Croatia (NDH), an Italian-German installed puppet state with the Croatian fascist Ustaše regime and its leader Ante Pavelić put in power. Under Ustaše rule, Serbs along with Jews and Roma people were subjected to systematic genocide, with Serbs being the main target due to their large population.

Serbs in villages in the countryside were hacked to death with various tools, thrown alive into pits and ravines or in some cases locked in churches that were afterwards set on fire. The scale of the violence meant that approximately every sixth Serb living in Bosnia and Herzegovina was the victim of a massacre and virtually every Serb had a family member that was killed in the war, mostly by the Ustaše. The experience had a profound impact in the collective memory of Serbs in Croatia and Bosnia. Others were sent to concentration camps. The Kruščica concentration camp, located near the town of Vitez, was one of the concentration camps established by Ustashe; it was founded in April 1941 for Serb and Jewish women and children. According to the US Holocaust Museum, 320,000–340,000 Serbs were murdered under Ustasha rule. An estimated 209,000 Serbs or 16.9% of its Bosnia population were killed on the territory of Bosnia and Herzegovina during the war. In an interview on 4 November 2015, Bakir Izetbegović, Bosniak Member of the Presidency of Bosnia and Herzegovina, affirmed the persecutions of Serbs in the Independent State of Croatia as genocide.

A multi-ethnic resistance against the Axis emerged in the form of the Yugoslav Partisans, led by Josip Broz Tito. At the same time, a Serbian nationalist and royalist guerilla in the Chetniks was formed, led by Draža Mihailović which was initially a resistance movement but became increasingly collaborationist. Serb allegiance was split between the Partisans and Chetniks, although Serbs in eastern Bosnia aligned themselves more with the Partisans who experienced military success in the area.

As in other parts of the NDH, the Ustaše policies in Bosnia and Herzegovina caused a rebellion among the Serb population. In June 1941, Serbs in eastern Herzegovina staged an armed rebellion against the NDH authorities following massacres of Serbs, which was suppressed after two weeks. Persecution of Serbs resulted in the prevalence of resistance movements in Serb populated areas including parts of Bosnia. Another rebellion, led by the Partisans, began on July 27, 1941. Some of these insurgents in turn committed atrocities against the Muslim and Croat population. In the early stages of the war, Serbs formed around 90% of Partisan units that were active in the NDH. Most of the anti-fascist combat and battles were fought in mainly Serb-inhabited areas of Bosnia & Herzegovina, such as the Battle of Neretva, Battle of Sutjeska, Drvar Operation and Kozara Battle. During the entire course of the WWII in Yugoslavia, according to the records of recipients of Partisan pensions, 64.1% of all Bosnian Partisans were Serbs. The Partisans liberated Sarajevo on 6 April 1945 and Bosnia came under full control a few weeks later. The Socialist Federal Republic of Yugoslavia was established and the constitution of 1946 officially made Bosnia and Herzegovina one of six constituent republics in the new Yugoslav state.

Bosnian War

Following Slovenia and Croatia's declaration of independence in June 1991, Bosnia and Herzegovina was faced with the dilemma of whether to stay in the Yugoslav federation or seek its own independence. Independence was favored by most Bosniaks and Croats but opposed by most Bosnian Serbs. On 15 October 1991, the parliament of the Socialist Republic of Bosnia and Herzegovina in Sarajevo passed a 'memorandum on sovereignty' causing a desertion of the parliament from Bosnian Serb representatives. On 24 October 1991, the Serb Democratic Party (SDS) formed the Assembly of the Serb People of Bosnia and Herzegovina declaring that the Serb people wished to remain in Yugoslavia. On 9 January 1992, the Bosnian Serbs proclaimed the "Republic of the Serbian People in Bosnia-Herzegovina". From 29 February-1 March 1992, a European Community-backed Bosnian referendum was held in which 99.7 percent voted for independence. The turnout was only 63.4 percent, as it was boycotted by Bosnian Serbs. Following Bosnia's declaration of independence, violent skirmishes eventually broke out into full-scale war by 6 April 1992.

The war ended after NATO Bombardment of Bosnian Serb positions, which led to peace talks and the signing of the Dayton Accords in December 1995. The agreements established the Serb republic (Republika Srpska) as an entity within the Federation of Bosnia and Herzegovina.

Demographics 

According to the 2013 census, there were 1,086,733 Serbs living in Bosnia and Herzegovina, or 30,78% of the total population. The vast majority of them, 1,001,299 lived in Republika Srpska or 92,13% of the total Serb population. In Republika Srpska itself, the Serbs form an absolute majority of 81,51% of the total population. On the other hand, there were 56,550 Serbs in the Federation of Bosnia and Herzegovina or 5,20% of the total Serb population. The Serbs made 2,55 percent of the population of the Federation of Bosnia and Herzegovina. Also, there was 28,884 living in the Brčko District or 2,66% of the total Serb population. They made 34,58 percent of the total population of the Brčko District.

Demographic history

Medieval Bosnia and Ottoman Empire
Heading 32 of De Administrando Imperio of Constantine Porphyrogenitus, is called "On the Serbs and the lands in which they live". It speaks of the territories inhabited by Serbs in which he mentions Bosnia, specifically two inhabited cities, Kotor and Desnik, both of which are in an unidentified geographic position.

Austria-Hungary and Kingdom of Serbs, Croats and Slovenes (Kingdom of Yugoslavia)
Austria-Hungary pursued a demographic policy of reducing the Serbian population and trying to erase their identity, converting it to a "Bosnian nationhood", therefore, Austrian population census only had religious affiliation as a main determinism of identity.  In the last Austrian census of 1910, there were 825,418 Orthodox Serbs, which constituted 43.49% of the total population. The Catholic Encyclopedia, 1917, states: "According to the census of 22 April 1895, Bosnia has 1,361,868 inhabitants and Herzegovina 229,168, giving a total population of 1,591,036. The number of persons to the square mile is small (about 80), less than that in any of the other Austrian crown provinces excepting Salzburg (about 70). This average does not vary much in the six districts (five in Bosnia, one in Herzegovina). The number of persons to the square mile in these districts is as follows: Doljna Tuzla, 106; Banjaluka, 96; Bihac, 91; Serajevo, 73, Mostar(Herzegovina), 65, Travnik, 62. There are 5,388 settlements, of which only 11 have more than 5,000 inhabitants, while 4,689 contain less 500 persons. Excluding some 30,000 Albanians living in the south-east, the Jews who emigrated in earlier times from Spain, a few Osmanli Turks, the merchants, officials. and Austrian troops, the rest of the population (about 98 per cent) belong to the southern Slavonic people, the Serbs. Although one in race, the people form in religious beliefs three sharply separated divhe Mohammedans, about 550,000 persons (35 per cent), Greek Schismatics, about 674,000 persons (43 per cent), and Catholics, about 334,000 persons (21.3 per cent). The last mentioned are chiefly peasants."

World War II
Serbs suffered a drastic demographic shift during WWII due to their persecution. The official brutal policies of the Independent State of Croatia, involving expulsion, murder and forced conversion to Catholicism of Orthodox Serbs, contributed that Serbs never recover within Bosnia & Herzegovina. By the plans of Nazi Germany and the Independent State of Croatia 110,000 Serbs were relocated and transported to German-occupied Serbia. Just in the period of May to August 1941 over 200,000 Serbs were expelled to Serbia. In the heat of war Serbia had 200,000–400,000 Serbian refugees from Ustaša-held Bosnia and Herzegovina. By the end of war 137,000 Serbs had permanently left the territories of Bosnia and Herzegovina. The Federal Bureau of Statistics in Belgrade composed a figure of 179,173 persons killed in the war in Bosnia and Herzegovina during the Second World War: 129,114 Serbs (72.1%); 29,539 Muslims (16.5%); 7,850 Croats (4.4%); others (7%).

Communist Yugoslavia
Communist authorities implemented a policy of silent "demographic emptying" of Serbs from Bosnia, by dividing Serbs into several republics, causing a "brain drain" of Serbs from Bosnia to Serbia. Also, the communist policies of rapid urbanization and industrialization, devastated the traditional rural life of Serbs, causing drastic halt in natural growth of Serbs. The first Yugoslav census recorded a decreasing number of Serbs; from the first census in 1948 to the last one from 1991, the percentage of Serbs decreased from 44.3% to 31.2%, even though the total number increased. According to the 1953 census, Serbs were in the majority in 74% of the territory of Bosnia & Herzegovina. Their total number in 1953 was 1,261,405, that is 44.3% of total Bosnian population. According to the 1961 census, Serbs made up 42.9% of total population, and their number was 1,406,057. After that, districts were divided into smaller municipalities.

According to the 1971 census, Serbs were 37.2% of total population, and their number was 1,393,148. According to the 1981 census, Serbs made up 32.02% of total population, and their number was 1,320,644. After 1981, their percentage continued to reduce. From 1971 to 1991, the percentage of Serbs fell due to emigration into Montenegro, Serbia, and Western Europe. According to the 1991 census, Serbs were 31.21% of the total population, and their number was 1,369,258.

Bosnian War 

The total number of Serbs in Bosnia and Herzegovina continued to reduce, especially after the Bosnian War broke out in 1992. Soon, an exodus of Bosnian Serbs occurred when a large number of Serbs were expelled from central Bosnia, Ozren, Sarajevo, Western Herzegovina and Krajina. According to the 1996 census, made by UNHCR and unrecognized by Sarajevo, there was 3,919,953 inhabitants, of which 1,484,530 (37.9%) were Serbs. In the territory of Bosnia and Herzegovina, the percentage of Serbs slightly changed, although, their total number reduced.

Politics

State level

The Parliamentary Assembly of Bosnia and Herzegovina has two chambers, the House of Representatives and the House of Peoples. The House of Representatives has 42 members who are elected directly by voters, of which 28 are from the Federation and 14 from Republika Srpska, the Serb entity of Bosnia and Herzegovina. The House of Peoples has 15 members, five Bosniaks, five Croats and five Serbs who are each elected for a four-year term. Bosniak and Croat members of the House of Peoples are elected by the Parliament of the Federation of Bosnia and Herzegovina, while the five Serb members are elected by the National Assembly of Republika Srpska.

The Presidency of Bosnia and Herzegovina has three members, one Bosniak, one Croat and one Serb who are tasked with foreign, diplomatic and military affairs, as well as the budget of state-level institutions. The Bosniak and the Croat are elected in the Federation of Bosnia and Herzegovina, while the Serb is elected in the Republika Srpska. Additionally, the Chairman of the Council of Ministers of Bosnia and Herzegovina is nominated by the Presidency and confirmed by the House of Representatives. This post switches between Croat, Bosniak and Serb representation every eight months.

The current president of the Republika Srpska is Željka Cvijanović. The current Serb member of the Presidency is Milorad Dodik of the SNSD.

Federal level
Like the Federation, Repubika Srpska has its own people's assembly. It consists of 83 members. Republika Srpska has jurisdiction over its own healthcare, education, agriculture, culture, veteran issues, labour, police and internal affairs. The Constitution of Republika Srpska notes that the entity has its own president as well as the ability to perform its own "constitutional, legislative, executive and judicial functions". This includes a police force, supreme court and lower courts, customs service (under the state-level customs service), and a postal service. Republika Srpska also has a Prime Minister and sixteen ministries. It also has its symbols, including coat of arms, flag (a variant of the Serbian flag without the coat of arms displayed) and entity anthem. 

Although the constitution names Sarajevo as the capital of Republika Srpska, the northwestern city of Banja Luka is the headquarters of most of the institutions of government, including the parliament, and is therefore the de facto capital. After the war, Republika Srpska retained its army, but in August 2005, the parliament consented to transfer control of the Army of Republika Srpska to a state-level ministry and abolish the entity's defense ministry and army by 1 January 2006. These reforms were required by NATO as a precondition of Bosnia and Herzegovina's admission to the Partnership for Peace programme. Bosnia and Herzegovina joined the programme in December 2006.

Political parties
There are several Serbian political parties in Bosnia and Herzegovina, and Republika Srpska. The Alliance of Independent Social Democrats (SNSD) has been the dominant party in  Republika Srpska since 2006, when it scored its first electoral success. Its reformist and socialist ideology has largely shifted and it has increasingly towed a nationalist and secessionist line. The Serbian Democratic Party (SDS) is the leading opposition party. Founded in 1990 by Radovan Karadžić, it was formerly the strongest political party in the entity before internal strife led to its fragmentation. Other notable but smaller parties include the Party of Democratic Progress (PDP) and National Democratic Movement (Bosnia and Herzegovina) (NDP).

Culture

The cultural and educational society Prosvjeta was founded in Sarajevo in 1902. It quickly became the most important organization gathering ethnic Serb citizens. In 1903 Gajret, a Serbian Muslim Cultural Society was founded. The Academy of Sciences and Arts of the Republika Srpska is active since 1996.

Architecture and art

Bosnia and Herzegovina is rich in Serbian architecture, especially when it comes to numerous Serbian churches and monasteries. The modern Serbo-Byzantine architectural style which started in the second half of the 19th century is  present in sacral and civil architecture. Bosnian topography thus becomes linked with the Serbian state and Orthodox Serb principles. Churches and monasteries are decorated with frescoes and iconostasis, art expressions which go back to Orthodox churches and monasteries built in the sixteenth and seventeenth centuries. The Museum of Old Orthodox Church in Sarajevo is among the top five in the world in its rich treasury of icons and other objects dating from different centuries.

Bosnian Serbs have made a significant contribution to modern Serbian painting. Notable painters include Miloš Bajić, considered to be the first abstract painter in Yugoslavia, Jovan Bijelić, a prominent expressionist who drew upon the Bosnian landscape, Vojo Dimitrijević, Nedeljko Gvozdenović, Kosta Hakman, Branko Šotra, Mica Todorović, and others. In 1907, Pero Popović, Branko Radulović and Todor Švrakić exhibited their works in one of the two exhibitions that year that marked the beginnings of the modern painting tradition in Bosnia and Herzegovina.

Among the prominent sculptors is Sreten Stojanović.

Language and literature

The Serbs of Bosnia and Herzegovina speak the Eastern Herzegovinian dialect of Serbian language, characterized by the ijekavian pronunciation.

Traces of Serbian language on this territory are very old as in old inscriptions such as Grdeša's tombstone, the oldest known stećak. One of the most important Serbian manuscripts Miroslav Gospel, was written for the Serbian Grand Prince Miroslav of Hum. Serbian language is rich with several medieval gospels written in Bosnia and Herzegovina. They are decorated with miniatures. The Serb medieval experience flourished in Medieval Bosnia through the development of Serb religious literature and refinement of the language.

In the early 16th century Božidar Goraždanin founded the Goražde printing house. It was one of the earliest printing houses among the Serbs, and the first in the territory of present-day Bosnia and Herzegovina. Goražde Psalter printed there is counted among the better accomplishments of early Serb printers.

Beginning in the nineteenth century, Bosanska vila from Sarajevo and Zora from Mostar, were important literary magazines at the forefront of political and cultural issues.

Bosnian Serbs gave significant contribution to the Serbian epic poetry. Famous singers of the epic poetry are Filip Višnjić and Tešan Podrugović.

The works of Serbian writers from Bosnia and Herzegovina are of great importance to the entire Serbian literature. Notable authors include Aleksa Šantić, Jovan Dučić, Petar Kočić, Sima Milutinović Sarajlija, and Svetozar Ćorović.

Music

Traditional instruments such as gusle, frula, gajde, and tamburica are utilized by the Serbs of Bosnia and Herzegovina for musical performances. The first Serbian singing societies in Bosnia and Herzegovina were set up in Foča (1885), Tuzla (1886), Prijedor (1887), and in Mostar and Sarajevo in 1888 along with other cities across the country. The first concert in Bosnia and Herzegovina was held in Banja Luka in 1881.

Serbian music is rich in folk songs of Serbian people in Bosnia and Herzegovina. Many songs are performed in traditional way of singing called ojkanje. Serbian singers and composers such as Rade Jovanović, Jovica Petković, Dragiša Nedović and others gave significant contribution to special type of songs called sevdalinka. Aleksa Šantić's poem Emina became one of the most known sevdalinkas. Notable performers of folk music include Vuka Šeherović, Nada Mamula, Nada Obrić, and Marinko Rokvić.

Bosnian and Heregovian Serbs largely participated in the Yugoslav pop-rock scene that was active from the end of the World War II until the break up of the country. Serbian musicians are or were members, and often leaders of popular bands such as Ambasadori, Bijelo Dugme, Bombaj Štampa, Indexi, Plavi orkestar, ProArte, Regina, Vatreni Poljubac, and Zabranjeno pušenje. Zdravko Čolić is one of the biggest Yugoslav and Serbian music stars. Jadranka Stojaković and Srđan Marjanović have had significant careers as singer-songwriters.

Post Yugoslav popular music singers include Željko Samardžić, Romana, Nedeljko Bajić Baja, Saša and Dejan Matić. Bosnian Serb Dušan Šestić composed the national anthem of Bosnia and Herzegovina.

Theatre and cinema

The first theatre show in Bosnia and Herzegovina was organized by Serb Stevo Petranović in Tešanj in 1865 while the first shows in Sarajevo were organized in the house of Serb Despić family. The first feature film in Bosnia and Herzegovina, Major Bauk was directed by Nikola Popović by the script of Branko Ćopić.

Significant directors include Emir Kusturica, double winner of the Palme d'Or at the Cannes Film Festival, Zdravko Šotra, Predrag Golubović, and Boro Drašković. Prominent screenwriters include Gordan Mihić, and Srđan Koljević. Actors that have achieved success in Yugoslav and Serbian cinematography include Predrag Tasovac, Branko Pleša, Marko Todorović, Tihomir Stanić, Nikola Pejaković, Nebojša Glogovac, Davor Dujmović, Nataša Ninković, and Danina Jeftić.

Folklore
Serbs of Bosnia and Herzegovina gave significant contribution to the folklore of Serbian people, including folk costume, music, traditional singing and instruments, epic poetry, crafts, and dances. The dresses of Bosnia are divided into two groups; the Dinaric and Pannonian styles. In Eastern Herzegovina, the folk costumes are closely related to those of Old Herzegovina. Cultural and artistic societies across the country practice folklore tradition.

Education 

The first educational institutions in Bosnia were religious sites, with priests serving as teachers in monasteries in the case of Bosnian Serbs. In 1878, the first year of Austro-Hungarian occupation, there were 56 Orthodox schools in Bosnia and Herzegovina, most of whom were founded toward the end of Ottoman rule. The number grew to 107 by 1910 but by World War I, they were banished by Austro-Hungarian authorities and never revived. The first girls' school was established in Sarajevo by Staka Skenderova in 1858.
 
The educational system of Bosnia and Herzegovina during communism was based on a mixture of nationalities and the suppression of Serb identity, as Tito focused on building the social dimension of the country. With the foundation of Serb Republic of Bosnia and Herzegovina during the Bosnian War, Bosnian Serb school curriculums underwent changes to adapt more towards Serbia. Following the end of the war and establishment of Republika Srpska through the Dayton Accords, jurisdiction over education in Republika Srpska was given to the RS Government, while in the Federation, jurisdiction over education was given to the cantons. The University of Sarajevo split into two, with the Bosniak division located in Western Sarajevo, and the Serbian one renamed University of East Sarajevo, with Serbian as its official language. The University of Banja Luka became part of Republika Srpska. Municipalities with Serb majority or significant minority, schools with Serbian language as official one also exist.

Religion

The Serbs of Bosnia and Herzegovina are predominantly Eastern Orthodox Christians, belonging to the Serbian Orthodox Church. According to the CIA World Factbook, Orthodox Christians make up 30.7% of the country's population.

The jurisdiction of the Serbian Orthodox Church in Bosnia is organized into five subdivisions consisting of one metropolitanate and four eparchies. In 1220, Archbishop Sava founded the  medieval Eparchy of Dabar which stretched into Bosnia. After the restoration of the Serbian Patriarchate of Peć in 1557, it became the Eparchy of Dabar and Bosnia, eventually gaining the status of metropolitanate. In 1611, the Orthodox eparchy of Hum was split into two regions before consolidating into the Eparchy of Zahumlje and Herzegovina the following century. Around 1532, an Orthodox episcopate was established in Zvornik and transferred to Tuzla in 1852, becoming the Tuzla-Zvornik episcopate. The Eparchy of Banja Luka was formed in 1900 and the Eparchy of Bihać and Petrovac originally formed in 1925 but abolished in 1934 was re-instated in 1990.

The Orthodox Theological Faculty of St. Basil of Ostrog and the Orthodox Seminary of St. Peter of Dabar-Bosnia are the two Orthodox institutions of higher learning in Bosnia and Herzegovina and they are both located in Foča. They both have historical continuity with the Sarajevo-Reljevo Theological Seminary that was founded in 1882, as the first Serbian high school in Bosnia. There are many Serbian churches and monasteries across the Bosnia and Herzegovina hailing from different periods. Each subdivision has its cathedral church and bishop's palace.

Sport

Serbs of Bosnia and Herzegovina have contributed significantly to the Yugoslav and Serbian sport.

First Serbian Sokol societies on the present territory of Bosnia and Herzegovina were founded in the late 19th century by intellectuals. Stevan Žakula, Croatian Serb, is remembered as a prominent worker in opening and maintaining sokol and gymnastic clubs. Žakula was the initiator of the establishment of Serbian gymnastics society "Obilić" in Mostar and Sports and gymnastic society "Serbian soko" in Tuzla. Sokol societies were also established in another cities across the Bosnia and Herzegovina.

Football is the most popular sport among the Bosnian Serbs. The oldest Serb dominated Club in Bosnia and Herzegovina is Slavija Istočno Sarajevo, founded in 1908, while one of the most popular is Borac Banja Luka winner of Mitropa Cup and Yugoslav Cup. Serbian clubs participate in Premier League of Bosnia and Herzegovina and First League of the Republika Srpska which is run by Football Association of Republika Srpska. Notable players that represented Yugoslavia, Serbia and  Bosnia include Branko Stanković, Milan Galić, Velimir Sombolac, Dušan Bajević, Boško Antić, Ilija Pantelić, Miloš Šestić, Savo Milošević, Mladen Krstajić, Neven Subotić, Zvjezdan Misimović, Luka Jović, Sergej Milinković-Savić, Ognjen Vranješ, Gojko Cimirot, Srđan Grahovac, Nemanja Bilbija, Dario Đumić, Zoran Kvržić, Mijat Gaćinović, Rade Krunić  ... etc. Zvjezdan Misimović served as captain of the Bosnia and Herzegovina national team from 2007 to 2012 while Ljupko Petrović led Red Star Belgrade to the Champions League trophy in 1991. Marko Marin is a German player of Serbian ethnicity. Cican Stanković is an Austrian player of Serbian ethnicity.

The second most popular sport among Bosnian Serbs is basketball. Aleksandar Nikolić, is often referred to as, The Father of Yugoslav Basketball. He was voted two times European Coach of the Year winning three Euroleagues and two times FIBA Intercontinental Cup. Second of four fathers of Yugoslav basketball is Borislav Stanković, former general secretatary of FIBA and IOC member. Some of the players that successfully competed at the biggest world competitions are Ratko Radovanović, Dražen Dalipagić, Zoran Savić, Predrag Danilović, Vladimir Radmanović, Jelica Komnenović, Slađana Golić, Saša Čađo, Ognjen Kuzmić... KK Igokea currently plays in regional ABA League.
Handball club Borac Banja Luka is the most successful Serbian handball club in Bosnia and Herzegovina. It won EHF Champions League in 1976 and was runner up in 1975. Svetlana Kitić was voted the best female handball player ever by the International Handball Federation. Other accomplished players include Dejan Malinović, Milorad Karalić, Nebojša Popović, Zlatan Arnautović, Radmila Drljača, Vesna Radović, Nebojša Golić, Mladen Bojinović, Danijel Šarić...

The most famous Serbian volleyball family, Grbić family, hails from Trebinje in Eastern Herzegovina. Father Miloš was the captain of the team that won first Yugoslav medal at European championship while sons Vanja and Nikola became Olympic champions with Serbian team. Other players that represented Serbia with success are Đorđe Đurić, Brankica Mihajlović, Tijana Bošković, Jelena Blagojević, Sanja and Saša Starović. Mitar Djuric is a Greek male volleyball player of Serbian ethnicity.

Besides team sports, Bosnian Serbs achieved success and in individual sports such as Slobodan and Tadija Kačar in boxing, Radomir Kovačević, Nemanja Majdov and Aleksandar Kukolj in judo, Milenko Zorić in canoeing, Velimir Stjepanović and Mihajlo Čeprkalo in swimming, Andrea Arsović in shooting, etc.

Notable people

Annotations

References

Bibliography
Books

 
 
 
 
 
 
 
 
 
 
 
 
 
 
 
 

Journals

Further reading
 
 Ćorović, Vladimir. Crna knjiga: patnje Srba Bosne i Hercegovine za vreme svetskog rata 1914–1918. Jugoslovenski dosije, 1989.

External links

Serbs in Bosnia and Herzegovine since the time of Petar Kočić until Republika Srpska (lecture in Serbian)

 
Serb people
Ethnic groups in Bosnia and Herzegovina